Josephine Butler (1828–1906) was an English feminist and social reformer in the Victorian era. She was especially concerned with the welfare of prostitutes although she campaigned on a broad range of women's rights. In 1864 her daughter Eva fell  from the top-floor bannister onto the stone floor of the hallway in her home; she died three hours later. The death led Butler to begin a career of campaigning that ran until the end of her life; she later wrote that after the death she "became possessed with an irresistible urge to go forth and find some pain keener than my own, to meet with people more unhappy than myself. ... It was not difficult to find misery in Liverpool." Her targets included obtaining the vote, the right to better education and the end of coverture in British law, although she achieved her greatest success in leading the movement to repeal the Contagious Diseases Acts, legislation that attempted to control the spread of venereal diseases, particularly in the British Army and Royal Navy. She was also opposed to the forced medical examination of prostitutes—a process she described as "surgical" or "steel rape". Her campaigning led to the suspension of the practice in April 1883, and the Acts were formally repealed in three years later.

Butler's first full-length publication was Memoir of John Grey of Dilston, detailing the life of her father, John Grey, which she wrote following his death. She also wrote a monograph of her husband George in 1892 after his death two years previously. In 1878 Butler published a third biography, this time of Catharine of Siena, which Glen Petrie—Butler's biographer—wrote was probably her best work. Another historian, Judith Walkowitz, considers the work as providing Butler with a "historical justification for her own political activism". Over a period of at least 40 years Butler wrote over 90 books and pamphlets, mostly in support of her campaigning work; because of her campaigning on mainland Europe, some of Butler's works—based on her speeches—were written in French and German, and were published in France, Germany and Switzerland.

Books

Miscellany

Pamphlets

Notes and references

Notes

References

Sources

 
 
 
 
 
 
 
 
 
  

Bibliographies by writer
Bibliographies of British writers